What Is Your Dangerous Idea?: Today's Leading Thinkers on the Unthinkable is a book edited by John Brockman, which deals with "dangerous" ideas, or ideas that some people would react to in ways that suggest a disruption of morality and ethics. Scientists, philosophers, artists, and various other groups of people have written in to the online salon called the Edge, where thinkers in several areas post and discuss their ideas.  This collection of responses forms the entirety of the book (possibly with some excluded because of the great number of posts).  The basic concept behind the book is "to gather a hundred of the most brilliant minds in the world in a room, lock them in, and have them ask each other the questions they were asking themselves".

Ideas 
Members of the Edge Foundation were asked this question in 2006:

The question was suggested by Steven Pinker, a psychologist.

People answered to this question in entries, some of which lasted several pages. These entries were posted in the Edge community forum. The ideas which were best expressed on the forum were posted in the book, organized according to subject. These ideas cover topics in physics, biology, religion, and other subjects.

Several of the contributors are well-known within the realm of science and philosophy.  These include Steven Pinker, Freeman Dyson, Daniel Dennett, Jared Diamond, Brian Greene, Matt Ridley, Howard Gardner, Richard Dawkins, and Martin Rees, as well as many others.  Not all of the contributors study the realm of philosophy or science; several contributors are also artists or writers.

Psychology 
The existence of the soul is discussed by John Horgan and Paul Bloom.  John Horgan discusses the possibility that the soul does not exist, while Paul Bloom further expands by discussing how the implication of the soul's nonexistence can have serious consequences.

Another topic many entries were based on is human behavior.  J. Craig Venter discussed the genetic base of how humans act; Jerry Coyne also wrote on the idea that people are predisposed to act in certain ways because of genetics.

Several authors wrote on the morals of people, consciousness, and human values. Many authors discussed how ideas themselves can be dangerous, or the idea that ideas can be dangerous.  One such author, Daniel Gilbert, states, in his entry:

Biology 
Several key ideas in biology were written about in the book, such as genetics, other life in the universe, and the origin of life.
The origin of life was discussed by two authors, Robert Shapiro and George Dyson.  Robert Shapiro believes that the origin of life will be found in the next five years, and George Dyson believes that we do not need to understand the origin of life to make progress in molecular biology.

Physics 
The anthropic principle was discussed by Leonard Susskind as well as Carlo Rovelli, who mentions it in his essay.  The anthropic principle claims that the universe is the way it is because if it was not specifically like how we see it, we would not be here to describe it. Leonard Susskind expands by talking about the idea that the anthropic principle can be seen as a threat to the mentality that every law governing the cosmos is set in stone; thus being unalterable.  

Susskind expresses in his entry the possibility that our universe is not the only universe (also expressed in an idea labeled "The Multiverse").  This is an idea where a large amount of universes are located in "the Landscape"; he expands by communicating that each universe has different physics laws that govern each of them, as can be seen in the quote above. The anthropic principle is also present in the idea. He claims, for example, that we are only here because our universe has the precise set of laws of physics that it has, and that very few universes have the laws of physics needed for intelligent life.

Beliefs 
Several different beliefs were mentioned in the essays such as the relationship between science and religion.  Sam Harris, in his essay titled "Science Must Destroy Religion," discusses different types of reason and belief as well as the conflict between science and religion.

Response 
According to Jill Murphy, a reviewer of the website "The Bookbag", What is Your Dangerous Idea? provides an easy-to-understand explanation of the topics covered in this book. She expands by writing that the ideas make the reader think about them.

The book has also been likened to "Shakespearean science" by one reviewer, due to the similar qualities it holds with William Shakespeare's works.

Another reviewer summarized the various ideas, concluding that science's progress may make us realize our limits.

Stephen Totilo, on MTV.com relates the book to gaming, in his article titled "Could Xbox Destroy the World?" The essay by Geoffrey Miller was discussed in how its topic (Fermi's paradox) could relate to how much people game. Miller states that the cause of the paradox might be that aliens become addicted to video games.

See also
What We Believe But Cannot Prove: Today's Leading Thinkers on Science in the Age of Certainty
The Third Culture: Beyond the Scientific Revolution
Intelligent Thought: Science Versus the Intelligent Design Movement
The Next Fifty Years: Science in the First Half of the Twenty-First Century
Edge Foundation, Inc.

Endnotes

References

External links
Review of What Is Your Dangerous Idea.
The Edge Foundation, where What Is Your Dangerous Idea originates.

2007 non-fiction books
2007 anthologies
Essay anthologies
Science books
Philosophy books
Books by John Brockman